An outdoor 2006 bronze statue of Irv Kupcinet by Preston Jackson is installed in Chicago, in the U.S. state of Illinois.
It is located on the sidewalk of  Wacker Drive near its intersection with Wabash Avenue, just steps from the Chicago Riverwalk.
The left hand of the sculpture gestures in the direction of Tribune Tower across the Chicago River.

See also
 2006 in art
 List of public art in Chicago

References

2006 establishments in Illinois
2006 sculptures
Bronze sculptures in Illinois
Monuments and memorials in Chicago
Outdoor sculptures in Chicago
Sculptures of men in Illinois
Statues in Chicago